The Legend of Barney Thomson, known in the United States as Barney Thomson, is a 2015 British comedy thriller film based on the 1999 novel The Long Midnight of Barney Thomson by Douglas Lindsay. It is the directorial debut of Robert Carlyle, who also stars in the film, alongside Emma Thompson, Ray Winstone, Ashley Jensen and Brian Pettifer. It was previewed at the 2015 Edinburgh International Film Festival in June 2015 before its release on 24 July 2015. The film also won the BAFTA Scotland Award for Best Feature Film.

Plot
Set in Glasgow, the film centres around 50-year-old Barney Thomson, who works at Henderson's Barbers in Bridgeton and lives a life of desperate mediocrity. Barney's uninteresting life is turned upside down when he enters the grotesque and comically absurd world of a serial killer after accidentally killing his boss Wullie.

The film starts with Thomson, who lives a dull life as a Glasgow barber for 20 years, looked over by the owner James' son, the manager Wullie. Detective Inspector Holdall, meanwhile, is inspecting a string of body parts mailed across the city; due to a lack of progress, the case is handed over to D.I. June Robertson.

Wullie prepares to fire Thomson due to his pessimistic outbursts affecting business; after work one day, Thomson desperately pleads with Wullie, resulting in a struggle that causes him to accidentally stab him in the chest with a small set of scissors. A panicked Thomson bags the corpse and puts it in his car, which is witnessed by his friend Charlie.

Holdall begins questioning and following Thomson, who denies any knowledge of Wullie's habits or whereabouts. Resorting to his mother Cemolina for help, Thomson hides the body at her place, and is later horrified to discover that she chopped it up, shrink wrapped and labeled the parts, and kept them in the freezer. When a slip of the tongue by Charlie causes Thomson's younger coworker Chris Porter to suspect him, Thomson quietly confesses it an accident. When Chris attempts to attack him, a frightened Thomson strikes him in the chest with a mop, inadvertently killing him. Wrapping him up, he brings him to Cemolina's apartment; however, when he removes Wullie's remains from the freezer, he notices an extra hand inside of it, along with a notebook with addresses to various places that the killer's body parts have been mailed; along with that, he finds out that his mother has been prostituting herself for younger men.

Meanwhile, later, Thomson breaks into Chris' apartment to place Wullie's remains and frame him, but is foiled when he finds that his freezer is too small to hold the body; when Holdall and his partner investigate, Thomson leaves the parts behind as he flees. Confronting his mother, he realizes that she's the killer, and that she killed and mailed off her dates. After revealing that his father left, but not far and never contacted him, she strains herself as she cruelly mocks Thomson before dying of a heart attack (or possibly a stroke).

After Cemolina's services, Thomson dumps Chris' body in Loch Lubnaig, and he angrily strangles Charlie when he suspects that he knows about Chris, though ashamedly leaves.

The next day, James makes Thomson head barber, but he's called into the middle of the woods. There, both police duos confront each other, and in a rival shootout, they're all killed. Though Holdall accuses him, Thomson reveals the real circumstances, though Holdall dies before hearing it all.

With his name cleared, Thomson is satisfied as he becomes a local legend for being the only survivor.

Cast
 Robert Carlyle as Barney Thomson 
 Emma Thompson as Cemolina, Barney's mother
 Ray Winstone as Detective Inspector Holdall
 Ashley Jensen as Detective Inspector June Robertson
Martin Compston as Chris Porter, barber
Kevin Guthrie as Detective Sergeant MacPherson
 Sam Robertson as Detective Sergeant Sam Jobson
 Brian Pettifer as Charlie, Barney's friend
 Stephen McCole as Wullie Henderson, Barney's boss
 Eileen McCallum as Mrs. Gaffney
 James Cosmo as James Henderson, Wullie's father and the owner of Henderson's Barbers
 Barbara Rafferty as Jean Monkrieff
 Tom Courtenay as Chief Superintendent McManaman

Reception

The review aggregator Rotten Tomatoes reports a 61% proportion of positive reviews, based on 33 reviews and a weighted average score of 5.9/10. The website's critical consensus reads, "The Legend of Barney Thomson may not quite live up to its grandiose title, but it offers a fine calling card for debuting director Carlyle, and Emma Thompson's performance adds a spark." At the review aggregator Metacritic, the film has a weighted average score of 59 out of 100, based on 9 reviews, indicating "mixed or average reviews".

Writing for The List, Eddie Harrison gave the film 2/5 and commented that the film's "brand of gallows humour feels woefully dated; it’s such a shame that Carlyle’s poor selection of script has rendered his first attempt to direct as dead on arrival." He also criticised the film's ending as being "delivered on the indulgent level of a student film." David Jenkins, writing for Little White Lies, gave the film a negative review, concluding it as "Awful, anachronistic material delivered with a total paucity of charm."

References

External links
 Official website on Facebook
 Official website on Twitter
 
 The Legend of Barney Thomson at Box Office Mojo
 
 
  (rating 3/5)

2015 films
2010s crime comedy films
British comedy thriller films
Scottish comedy films
Scottish thriller films
2010s comedy thriller films
Films based on British novels
British serial killer films
Films set in Glasgow
Films shot in Glasgow
2015 directorial debut films
2015 comedy films
English-language Scottish films
English-language Canadian films
2010s English-language films
2010s British films